Voyage of the Little Mermaid is a live show attraction at Disney's Hollywood Studios at the Walt Disney World Resort in Florida. Voyage is an abridgment of the 1989 film The Little Mermaid. Along with a mix of live actors and puppets, the show features effects such as light and laser projections on the auditorium walls and light rain over the audience. Voice actors include Jess Harnell (initially Samuel E. Wright) as Sebastian, Pat Carroll as Ursula, Corey Burton (initially Kenneth Mars) as King Triton, Edan Gross as Flounder, Paddi Edwards as Flotsam and Jetsam, and Frank Welker as Max the Sheepdog. Wright, Carroll, Mars, Edwards, and Welker reprise their roles from the original film. The show replaced the previous attraction, Here Come The Muppets, on January 7, 1992, in the Animation Courtyard Theater.

Synopsis 
The show starts out with a preshow following artifacts including King Triton's trident.  Then guests enter a theater where the show begins. Due to the special effects that are involved in the attraction, guests are asked to remain seated during the performance.  It starts with the Oscar-winning song "Under the Sea", featuring various "black light" puppets, then goes into "Part of Your World", which is followed by Ursula singing "Poor Unfortunate Souls". This song is performed by a gigantic puppet, 12 feet tall and 10 feet wide. After Ursula steals Ariel's voice, a montage of the film leading up to the demise of the sea witch is shown. It then goes to the scene where King Triton lets Ariel go with Prince Eric. At the end of the show, a curtain of falling water covers the stage, allowing guests to "return" to the surface. Voyage of the Little Mermaid is located in the Animation Courtyard section.

References

External links 
 Official site

The Little Mermaid (franchise) in amusement parks
Disney's Hollywood Studios
Animation Courtyard
Musicals based on animated films
Musicals based on multiple works
Musicals based on works by Hans Christian Andersen
1992 establishments in Florida